Minutes to Midnight is the fourth track on the 1984 album Red Sails in the Sunset by Australian music group Midnight Oil. The song was written by band members Peter Garrett and Jim Moginie.

The title and lyrics of the song allude to the Doomsday Clock, a symbolic timepiece published by the Bulletin of the Atomic Scientists, which represents the proximity of nuclear war (or more generally "catastrophic destruction"), designated as "midnight".  Nuclear confrontation was pertinent at the time of this song, the clock having regressed to a mere "three minutes to midnight" in 1984 from some 12 minutes in the preceding decade.  This was the closest to midnight the clock had reached since the overt testing of H-Bombs by the US and Soviet Union in 1953.  This setting was surpassed only recently, after the inauguration of American president Donald Trump in January 2017, when the clock was set at two-and-a-half minutes to midnight.

The lyrics warn of escalation in the arms race between the United States and the Soviet Union ("ICBMs, SS-20s / they lie so dormant, they got so many"), and allude to both H.G. Wells and heralded Australian racehorse Phar Lap.

References

1984 songs
Midnight Oil songs
Songs about nuclear war and weapons
Song recordings produced by Nick Launay
Songs written by Peter Garrett
Songs written by Jim Moginie